Lysinibacillus antri is a Gram-positive, rod-shaped, endospore-forming and motile bacterium from the genus of Lysinibacillus which has been isolade from soil from a karst cave in Xingyi county.

References

Bacillaceae
Bacteria described in 2020